Râul Cheii may refer to the following rivers in Romania:

 Râul Cheii, a tributary of the Tarcău in Neamț County
 Râul Cheii, a tributary of the Vâlsan in Argeș County

See also 
 Cheia River (disambiguation)
 Valea Cheii River (disambiguation)